Arthur Morgan (born 23 July 1954) is an Irish former Sinn Féin politician. He was a Teachta Dála (TD) for the Louth constituency from 2002 to 2011.

Morgan was born in Omeath in County Louth. Educated locally, he joined the small family fish-processing company, where he became a director.  He is a founding member of Cooley Environmental and Health Action Committee which campaigns against Sellafield nuclear power station.

Morgan is a former Provisional Irish Republican Army prisoner. He was sentenced to 14 years in jail after being arrested on a boat on Carlingford Lough during an operation in 1977. He served seven and a half years at Long Kesh prison, where he participated in the blanket protest, before being released in 1984.

He was an unsuccessful Dáil candidate at the 1987 and 1989 general elections. At the 1999 European Parliament election Morgan polled over 20,000 votes in the Leinster constituency but failed to be elected. He was elected to Louth County Council on the same day for the Dundalk/Carlingford area. At the 2002 general election he was elected to Dáil Éireann as a Sinn Féin TD and retained his seat at the 2007 general election.

In a Dáil debate on the budget on 6 March 2008, Morgan launched a strong attack on the government's economic policy, saying that "There is more social conscience in a cat's arse than there is in the entire Fianna Fáil parliamentary party." Condemning a Government proposal to give tax breaks for the development of private hospices, he asked "Why would I expect any different from a Tánaiste and a Government over this partial Parliament in this little semi-statelet over which he is presiding?". Deputy Michael Finneran responded by saying that "if it was not for him and his fellow travellers we would have had considerably more money to invest in many projects over the years instead of needing to spend it on security to protect the State."

On 9 November 2010, he announced that he would not be contesting the 2011 general election.

References

 

1954 births
Living people
Irish republicans imprisoned under Prevention of Terrorism Acts
Local councillors in County Louth
Members of the 29th Dáil
Members of the 30th Dáil
Politicians from County Louth
Provisional Irish Republican Army members
Sinn Féin TDs (post-1923)